Boštjan Goličič (born June 12, 1989) is a Slovenian ice hockey forward currently playing for Boxers de Bordeaux of the Ligue Magnus. He is a brother of Jurij Goličič.

He participated at several IIHF World Championships as a member of the Slovenia men's national ice hockey team.

Career statistics

Regular season and playoffs

International

References

External links

1989 births
Living people
Boxers de Bordeaux players
Brûleurs de Loups players
Calgary Hitmen players
Diables Rouges de Briançon players
HDD Olimpija Ljubljana players
Ice hockey players at the 2014 Winter Olympics
Ice hockey players at the 2018 Winter Olympics
Olympic ice hockey players of Slovenia
Rapaces de Gap players
Slovenian ice hockey left wingers
Sportspeople from Kranj